The Al-Enezi family is a Nisba that refers to the Anazzah tribe. Notable people include:

Surname
 Bandar Al-Enezi (born 1987), Saudi footballer
 Fahad Al Enezi (born 1988), Kuwaiti footballer

See also
Anizah

Arabic-language surnames
Arab groups
Tribes of Arabia
Tribes of Iraq